There are two lakes named Gallant Lake within the United States:

 Gallant Lake (Alabama), in Tuscaloosa County 
 Gallant Lake, a reservoir in Bandera County, Texas

References
 USGS-U.S. Board on Geographic Names